Gentry Stein is a yo-yo world champion. Stein won the 1A  Division of the World Yo-Yo Contest in 2014 and 2019, and received third place in 2011 and 2017. Stein won the 1A division title of the U.S. National Yo-Yo Contest in 2013, 2015, 2016 and 2019. Stein won the Open 1A division at the European Yo-Yo Championship in 2016. Stein is from Chico, California.

Stein is one of only 4 yo-yoers to ever get more than one world title in the 1A division.

Competitive career

References 

Living people
Yo-yo performers
Year of birth missing (living people)